Roepke is a surname. Notable people with the surname include:

 Carl Roepke, American luger
 Gabriela Roepke (1920–2013), Chilean playwright, actress, writer, and professor
 Johnny Roepke (1905–1962), American football player
 Walter Karl Johann Roepke (1882–1961), German entomologist
 Walt Roepke, American football player